Sergei Aleksandrovich Nilus (also Sergius, and variants; ;  – 14 January 1929) was a Russian religious writer, self-described mystic, and prolific anti-Semite.

His book Velikoe v malom i antikhrist, kak blizkaja politicheskaja vozmozhnost. Zapiski pravoslavnogo ("The Great within the Small and Antichrist, an Imminent Political Possibility. Notes of an Orthodox Believer", 1903), about the coming of the Antichrist, is now primarily known for the fact that in its second edition, in 1905, Nilus published The Protocols of the Elders of Zion as its final chapter. This was the first time that this text was published in full in Russia (an abridged version had reportedly been published in 1903 in the newspaper Znamya). He wrote a number of further books, mostly on topics of the end times and the Antichrist, published between 1908 and 1917. After the Russian revolution, his warning of the coming of the Antichrist were interpreted as a warning of the impending communist revolution, and his works were banned as anti-Soviet propaganda in the Soviet Union.

Life
His father was a Lutheran  of Livonian extraction (the surname Nilus is a Livonian form of Nicholas), his mother was from Russian nobility. Sergei was baptized in the Russian Orthodox rite. He studied law and graduated from the University of Moscow, and was a magistrate in Transcaucasia. He later moved to Biarritz, living there with a mistress named Natalya Komarovskaya until his estates went bankrupt and she broke off their relationship. Though he was raised in the Russian Orthodox faith, Nilus did not seem to care much about religion until an accident with his horse caused him to recall an unfulfilled childhood vow to visit the Troitse-Sergiyeva Lavra. Later he met St. John of Kronstadt, whom he credited with healing a throat infection and turning him fully back to his native faith.

In 1903, Nilus published his book Velikoye v malom i antikhrist kak blizkaya politicheskaya vozmozhnost'. Zapiski pravoslavnogo veruyushchego (The Great Within the Small and Antichrist, an Imminent Political Possibility. Notes of an Orthodox Believer). The text of the Protocols appeared as Chapter Twelve of the 1905 edition of the book. The newly appointed chairman of the Council of Ministers, Pyotr Stolypin, ordered an investigation into the provenance of the text, and it was soon discovered that it had first appeared in antisemitic circles in Paris, around the year 1897 or 1898.

In 1906, Nilus married Yelena Alexandrovna Ozerova, who had served as a lady-in-waiting to Alexandra Feodorovna, last empress of Russia. In 1907, Nilus moved to Optina Monastery, where he lived until 1912. During that time he published several books on spiritual topics, including his most widely read work, On the Bank of God's River, a portrait of his years at Optina and of the many Orthodox Starets living there. Nilus "discovered" the papers of Nikolay Motovilov, a Russian landowner and Fool for Christ, who was a disciple of St. Seraphim of Sarov. Nilus published one of the manuscripts as "A Wonderful Revelation to the World: The Conversation of St. Seraphim with Nicholas Alexandrovich Motovilov on the acquisition of the Holy Spirit". 
That manuscript would become one of the most-read Orthodox texts of modern times. In 1912, a report was received by the Holy Synod that Nilus was living at the monastery with his wife. Although the Niluses were not actually living within the monastery, but rather as guests in a small house nearby, Nilus was ordered by the Synod to leave Optina.

Nilus circulated several editions of The Protocols in Russia during the first decade of the twentieth century. Though the early prints were in Russian, The Protocols soon spread to the rest of Europe via expatriates who left Russia after the 1917 revolution. The Russian text was also reprinted in Berlin, in 1922. In Soviet Russia, Nilus was not able to publish any further writings until his death in 1929. Under the new Soviet government, Nilus was arrested and imprisoned several times, in 1924, 1925 and 1927.  He died on 14 January 1929 in Krutets village, Vladimir Oblast, USSR, after a heart attack. In the USSR, possession of Nilus' books was punished as "anti-Soviet propaganda" by up to ten years of imprisonment.

After the fall of the Soviet Union, Nilus' works were again edited in Russia, beginning in 1992, with an edition of his collected works appearing in five volumes in 2009.

Bibliography
 1903 «Великое в малом» ("The Great Within the Small"), 2nd ed. 1905, 3rd ed. 1911.
 1908 «Сила Божия и немощь человеческая» ("The Power of God and the Weakness of Man")
 1908 «Пшеница и плевелы» ("The Wheat and the Tares"), Holy Trinity-St. Sergeius Lavra.
 1911 «На берегу Божьей реки»   ("On the Bank of God's River"), 2nd ed. 1916; reprinted by Orthodox Christian Books and Icons, San Francisco, Calif., 1969.
 1911 «Святыня под спудом. Тайны православного монашеского духа» ("Holiness Under a Bushel. Secrets of the Orthodox Monastic Spirit") 
 1911 «Близ грядущий антихрист и царство диавола на земле» ("The Coming Antichrist and the Kingdom of the Devil on Earth Is Near"); reprinted 1992.
 1917 «Близ есть при дверех. О том, чему не желают верить и что так близко» ("Close by, at the Gates. What They Do Not Want to Believe and Which Is That Close By"); reprinted 1997, 2012, 2013. 

Posthumous editions:
 «С. А. Нилус. Полное собрание сочинений» (Collected Works in Five Volumes), Moscow, 2009.

References

Michael Hagemeister: "Vladimir Solov’ev and Sergej Nilus: Apocalypticism and Judeophobia" in Reconciler and Polemicist (eds.) Wil van den Bercken, Manon de Courten, Evert van der Zweerde, and Vladimir Solov’ev (Leuven: Peeters, 2000), pp. 287–296. 
Michael Hagemeister:"Sergei Nilus" in Antisemitism. A Historical Encyclopedia of Prejudice and Persecution vol. 2, pp. 508–510, ed. Richard E. Levy (Santa Barbara, CA.: ABC-Clio, 2005).

External links

 Alexandre du Chayla, "Nilus and the Protocols", La Tribune Juive: Paris, 14 May 1921, translated from the French by Herman Bernstein, New York, Covici, Friede [c. 1935].
 Autobiographical notes, translated  from Na Beregu Bozhyei Reki, published by St. Elias Publications, Forestville, 1975
 Michael Hagemeister, "The Protocols of the Elders of Zion: Between History and Fiction"
 Michael Hagemeister, "The Protocols of the Elders of Zion and the Myth of a Jewish Conspiracy in Post-Soviet Russia"
 Michael Hagemeister, "In Search of Testimony About the Origins of The Protocols of the Elders of Zion: A Handwritten Edition that Disappeared from the Lenin Library" 

1862 births
1929 deaths
19th-century people from the Russian Empire
20th-century Christian mystics
20th-century Russian people
Antisemitism in the Russian Empire
Eastern Orthodox conspiracy theorists
Eastern Orthodox mystics
Members of the Russian Assembly
People from Moskovsky Uyezd
Protocols of the Elders of Zion
Russian anti-communists
Russian conspiracy theorists
Russian Orthodox Christians from Russia